The 2022–23 UAB Blazers men's basketball team represents the University of Alabama at Birmingham during the 2022–23 NCAA Division I men's basketball season. The team is led by third-year head coach Andy Kennedy, and plays their home games at the Bartow Arena in Birmingham, Alabama as a member of Conference USA.

The season marks the team's last season as members of Conference USA before joining the American Athletic Conference on July 1, 2023.

Previous season
The Blazers finished the 2021–22 season 27–8, 14–4 in C-USA play to finish second in the West Division. As the No. 2 seed out of the West Division, they defeated Florida Atlantic, Middle Tennessee, and Louisiana Tech to win the C-USA tournament. They received the conference’s automatic bid to the NCAA tournament as the No. 12 seed in the South Region, where they lost in the first round to Houston.

Offseason

Departures

Incoming transfers

Recruiting classes

2022 recruiting class

2023 recruiting class

Roster

Schedule and results

|-
!colspan=12 style=|Exhibition

|-
!colspan=12 style=|Non-conference regular season

|-
!colspan=12 style=|Conference USA regular season

|-
!colspan=9 style=| Conference USA tournament

|-
!colspan=9 style=| NIT

Source

References

UAB Blazers men's basketball seasons
UAB Blazers
UAB Blazers men's basketball
UAB Blazers men's basketball
UAB